Mama Drama, is a 2020 Nigerian drama film directed by Seyi Babatope and produced by Joy Grant-Ekong. The film stars Osas Ighodaro in the lead role whereas Kunle Remi, Kehinde Bankole, Femi Adebayo, and Shafy Bello made supportive roles. The film revolves around Mena Adelana, a woman with six miscarriages, and she hires her assistant as a surrogate despite her fertility issues and her mother-in-law's nagging, but arise many problems.

The film made its premier on 1 October 2020 at Filmhouse Imax cinemas and later released through Netflix in 2021. The film received mixed reviews from critics.

Cast
 Osas Ighodaro as Mena Adelana
 Kunle Remi as Gboyega
 Kehinde Bankole as Kemi
 Femi Adebayo as Dotun
 Shafy Bello as Mama Adelana
 Adunni Ade as Simi
 Chinyere Wilfred as Aunty Nkem
 Olive Emodi as Barrister
 Rekiya Attah as Judge
 Opeyemi Ayeola as Ronke
 Adenola Adeniyi as Seyi Adelana
 Adeoluwa Daniels as Seyi Adelana
 Itombra Bofie as Hadiza

References

External links 
 

2020 films
English-language Nigerian films
2020 drama films
2020s English-language films